Irvin Alfred "Red" Scales (June 23, 1895 – October 13, 1943) was an American Negro league first baseman in the 1920s.

A native of Mount Airy, North Carolina, Scales played for the Pittsburgh Keystones in 1921. In five recorded games, he posted eight hits in 21 plate appearances. Scales died in Forsyth County, North Carolina in 1943 at age 48.

References

External links
Baseball statistics and player information from Baseball-Reference Black Baseball Stats and Seamheads

1895 births
1943 deaths
Pittsburgh Keystones players
Baseball first basemen
Baseball players from North Carolina
People from Mount Airy, North Carolina
20th-century African-American sportspeople